Adriana Reami (born November 13, 1997) is an American tennis player.

Reami has a career-high singles ranking by the WTA of 359, achieved on November 7, 2022. She also has a career-high WTA doubles ranking of 274, reached on January 30, 2023.

Reami won her first major ITF Circuit title at the 2022 Caldas da Rainha Ladies Open in the doubles draw, partnering Anna Rogers.

Reami played college tennis at the NC State.

ITF finals

Singles: 4 (4 titles)

Doubles 2 (2 titles)

References

External links
 
 

1997 births
Living people
American female tennis players
Tennis players from Miami
NC State Wolfpack women's tennis players